Parker is a city in Linn County, Kansas, United States.  As of the 2020 census, the population of the city was 241.

History
Parker was laid out about 1889. It was named for J.W. Parker, who owned the town site.

The first post office in Parker was established in December 1888.

Geography
Parker is located at  (38.328875, -94.990795).

Demographics

2010 census
As of the census of 2010, there were 277 people, 100 households, and 66 families residing in the city. The racial makeup of the city was 98.9% White, 0.4% from other races, and 0.7% from two or more races. Hispanic or Latino of any race were 5.4% of the population.

There were 100 households, of which 42.0% had children under the age of 18 living with them, 53.0% were married couples living together, 7.0% had a female householder with no husband present, 6.0% had a male householder with no wife present, and 34.0% were non-families. 26.0% of all households were made up of individuals, and 10% had someone living alone who was 65 years of age or older. The average household size was 2.77 and the average family size was 3.39.

The median age in the city was 30 years. 33.2% of residents were under the age of 18; 7.8% were between the ages of 18 and 24; 29.7% were from 25 to 44; 18.4% were from 45 to 64; and 10.8% were 65 years of age or older. The gender makeup of the city was 52.3% male and 47.7% female.

2000 census
As of the census of 2000, there were 281 people, 96 households, and 67 families residing in the city. The racial makeup of the city was 97.51% White, 0.36% from other races, and 2.14% from two or more races. Hispanic or Latino of any race were 0.36% of the population.

There were 96 households, out of which 43.8% had children under the age of 18 living with them, 59.4% were married couples living together, 8.3% had a female householder with no husband present, and 29.2% were non-families. 24.0% of all households were made up of individuals, and 8.3% had someone living alone who was 65 years of age or older. The average household size was 2.93 and the average family size was 3.59.

In the city, the population was spread out, with 34.9% under the age of 18, 9.6% from 18 to 24, 31.3% from 25 to 44, 11.4% from 45 to 64, and 12.8% who were 65 years of age or older. The median age was 30 years. For every 100 females, there were 97.9 males. For every 100 females age 18 and over, there were 92.6 males.

The median income for a household in the city was $24,531, and the median income for a family was $30,625. Males had a median income of $31,250 versus $21,250 for females. The per capita income for the city was $10,110. About 19.2% of families and 23.3% of the population were below the poverty line, including 33.6% of those under the age of eighteen and 21.1% of those 65 or over.

Education
The community is served by Prairie View USD 362 public school district.

Parker High School closed through school unification. The Parker Panthers won the Kansas State High School boys class B Track & Field championship in 1959.

Notable people
 Sam Brownback - former U.S. Senator and 46th Governor of Kansas.

See also
 Wikinews interview with Parker native and Kansas Senator Sam Brownback

References

Further reading

External links
 Parker - Directory of Public Officials
 Parker city map, KDOT

Cities in Kansas
Cities in Linn County, Kansas
1889 establishments in Kansas